Ethan Allen Hitchcock (May 18, 1798 – August 5, 1870) was a career United States Army officer and author who had War Department assignments in Washington, D.C., during the American Civil War, in which he served as a major general.

Early life
Hitchcock was born in Vergennes, Vermont. His father was Samuel Hitchcock (1755-1813), a lawyer who served as United States District Judge for Vermont, and his mother was Lucy Caroline Allen (1768-1842), the daughter of American Revolutionary War hero General Ethan Allen; although no likeness from the life of the revolutionary is extant, Lucy said that he strongly resembled Ethan Allen Hitchcock.  Hitchcock's siblings included Henry Hitchcock, a Chief Justice of the Alabama Supreme Court, who was married to the sister-in-law of Secretary of War John Bell. Henry's son Ethan Hitchcock served as United States Secretary of the Interior under William McKinley. Another of Henry's sons, Henry Hitchcock, was a prominent attorney in St. Louis.

Ethan A. Hitchcock graduated from the United States Military Academy in 1817 (17th out of 19) and was commissioned a third lieutenant of Field Artillery.

Career
He was promoted to captain in 1824. From 1829 to 1833, he served as commandant of cadets at West Point and was promoted to major in 1838. By 1842 he achieved the rank of lieutenant colonel in the 3rd Infantry Regiment, in command of Fort Stansbury.

He served in the Seminole War in Florida, in the Pacific Northwest, and in the Mexican–American War, where he served as Gen. Winfield Scott's inspector general in the march on Mexico City. He received a brevet promotion to colonel for Contreras and Churubusco and to brigadier general for Molino del Rey.

In 1851, he became the colonel of the 2nd Infantry. From 1851 to 1854, he commanded the Pacific Division and then the Department of the Pacific.

In October 1855, he resigned from the Army following a refusal by Secretary of War Jefferson Davis to extend a four-month leave of absence that he had requested for reasons of health. He moved to St. Louis, Missouri, and began a presumed retirement, occupying himself with writing and studies of general literature and philosophy.

Hitchcock was a diarist, and his journal entries from this time have served as a crucial source of evidence for Howard Zinn's reinterpretation of United States history, Voices of A People's History of the United States.

Civil War

After the start of the Civil War, Hitchcock applied to return to the service but was rejected. It was only after the intervention of Winfield Scott that he was commissioned a major general in February 1862 and became special adviser to the Secretary of War. From March 17 to July 23, 1862, he served as the chair of the War Board, the organization that assisted President Abraham Lincoln and Secretary of War Edwin M. Stanton in the management of the War Department and the command of the Union armies during the period in which there was no general-in-chief. (Maj. Gen. George B. McClellan had been relieved of his responsibilities as general-in-chief, and Maj. Gen. Henry W. Halleck had not yet replaced him.)

Hitchcock sat on the court-martial of Maj. Gen. Fitz John Porter, which convicted the general of disobedience and cowardice. From November 1862 through the war's end, he served as Commissioner for Prisoner of War Exchange and then Commissary-General of Prisoners.

Hitchcock was mustered out in 1867 and moved to Charleston, South Carolina, then to Sparta, Georgia.

Personal life
On April 20, 1868, he was married to Martha Rind Nicholls (1833–1918) in Washington, D.C.  Martha was a daughter of Isaac Smith Nicholls and Joanna Maria (née Rind) Nicholls.

Hitchcock died on August 5, 1870 at Glen Mary Plantation in Sparta, two years after his marriage.  He was buried in West Point National Cemetery, New York.  His widow died on August 15, 1918.

Contributions to alchemy studies
By his death, Hitchcock had amassed an extensive private library, including over 250 volumes on alchemy. This collection was widely regarded as one of the finest private holdings of rare alchemical works and is preserved by St. Louis Mercantile Library at the University of Missouri-St. Louis. Through Remarks upon Alchemy and the Alchemists and other writings, Hitchcock argued that the alchemists were actually religious philosophers writing in symbolism. In Problems of Mysticism and its Symbolism, the Viennese psychologist Herbert Silberer credited Hitchcock with helping to open the way for his explorations of the psychological content of alchemy.

Musical collection
Hitchcock also played the flute and amassed a sizable collection of flute music. In the 1960s, almost one hundred years after his death, part of Hitchcock's personal music collection was discovered in Sparta, Georgia. This collection, which consists of 73 bound volumes and approximately 200 loose manuscripts, currently resides in the Warren D. Allen Music Library at Florida State University. Included in this collection are works by some of the general's contemporaries, music manuscripts handwritten by Hitchcock himself, and items of personal correspondence. The library's acquisition of these materials was celebrated in 1989 by a recital given by F.S.U. flute students and attended by several of Hitchcock's descendants.

Selected works
 Remarks upon Alchemy and Alchemists (published in 1857)
 Swedenborg a Hermetic Philosopher (1858)
 Christ the Spirit (1861)
 The Story of the Red Book of Appin (1863)
 Spenser's Poem (1865)
 Notes on the Vita Nuova of Dante (1866)
 Remarks on the Sonnets of Shakespeare (1867)
 Fifty Years in Camp and Field (posthumous, 1909)
 A Traveler in Indian Territory: The Journal of Ethan Allen Hitchcock, Late Major-General in the United States Army (posthumous, 1930)

See also

 List of American Civil War generals (Union)

Notes

References
 Eicher, John H., and David J. Eicher. Civil War High Commands. Stanford, CA: Stanford University Press, 2001. .
 Warner, Ezra J. Generals in Blue: Lives of the Union Commanders. Baton Rouge: Louisiana State University Press, 1964. .

External links

 Military biography of Hitchcock from the Cullum biographies
 Encyclopedia of Oklahoma History and Culture - Hitchcock, Ethan Allen

1798 births
1870 deaths
American people of English descent
American military personnel of the Mexican–American War
American people of the Seminole Wars
Burials at West Point Cemetery
Commandants of the Corps of Cadets of the United States Military Academy
People from Vergennes, Vermont
People of Vermont in the American Civil War
Union Army generals
United States Military Academy alumni